Loepa schintlmeisteri, the Bright golden emperor moth, is a moth of the family Saturniidae.

References 
 , 2000, Zwei neue Arten der Gattung Loepa Moore, 1859 (Lepidoptera: Saturniidae), Nachr. entomol. Ver. Apollo N.F. 21 (3): 165–170.

Moths described in 2000
Saturniinae